Dragostunjë is a village in the Elbasan County, eastern Albania. Following the local government reform of 2015, Dragostunjë became a part of the municipality of Librazhd and is under the municipal unit of Qendër Librazhd

Demographic History
Dragostunjë is attested in the Ottoman defter of 1467 as a settlement in the vilayet of Çermeniça. The village had a total of nine households represented by the following household heads: Pop Jovani, Bogdan Primiqyri, Bogdan Berishi, Andrija Berishi, Gjergj Vasili, Kojo Prifti, Miri son of Todor, Todor son of Bogdan, and Dimitri Begoj.

References

Villages in Elbasan County
Populated places in Librazhd